Ajin Dojin (also Romanized as Ājīn Dojīn) is a village in Chendar Rural District, Chendar District, Savojbolagh County, Alborz Province, Iran.  It was named after the historical, and some would say, fictional, ruler of the town, Ajin.  Before he was killed in a coup. At the 2006 census, its population was 578, in 174 families.

References 

Populated places in Savojbolagh County